The Cathedral of the Nativity of the Blessed Virgin Mary, at 870 West Howard Avenue in Biloxi, Mississippi, is the seat of the Roman Catholic Diocese of Biloxi. It was designed by Theodore Brune and built by J.F. Barnes & Company of Greenville, Mississippi in 1902. The cathedral was added to the National Register of Historic Places in 1984.

Brune was a German-American architect who designed several churches on the Gulf Coast of Louisiana. The Gothic architecture design for the Blessed Virgin Mother Catholic Church on West Howard Avenue was constructed after the original church was destroyed by the Great Biloxi Fire of November 1900 on the same site. Stained glass windows were donated to the church by Julia Dulion Lopez (1857-1918) in memory of her late husband in early 1906. The windows were built by Reis and Reis of Munich, Germany and installed by Frederick Thornley of New York.

See also
List of Catholic cathedrals in the United States
List of cathedrals in the United States

References

External links

 Official Cathedral Site
 Roman Catholic Diocese of Biloxi Official Site
 Historical Marker Database - Cathedral of the Nativity of the Blessed Virgin Mary (Biloxi, Mississippi)

Churches in Harrison County, Mississippi
Buildings and structures in Biloxi, Mississippi
Gothic Revival church buildings in Mississippi
Churches on the National Register of Historic Places in Mississippi
Nativity
Roman Catholic churches completed in 1902
Roman Catholic churches in Mississippi
Roman Catholic Diocese of Biloxi
Tourist attractions in Harrison County, Mississippi
National Register of Historic Places in Harrison County, Mississippi
1902 establishments in Mississippi
20th-century Roman Catholic church buildings in the United States